Speers Tonight is an Australian television program on Sky News Australia. The program sees host David Speers interview a prominent guest, followed by a discussion of political issues from the week with journalists Paul Kelly and Peter Hartcher. The weekly program replaced similar format The Nation with David Speers on Thursday nights and was one of two programs hosted by Speers, the other being the four-times weekly PM Agenda.

The program debuted on 28 January 2016 with Anthony Albanese as the inaugural guest.

Episode 42 of the first season is the highest rated regular episode of Speers Tonight, when it was watched by 49,000 viewers, making it the third most viewed Sky News program and sixth most watched program on the Foxtel platform for that day. A special post-American election episode was watched by 89,000 viewers, ranked as the sixth most watched program on both Sky News and Foxtel for that day.

Episodes

Season 1 (2016)

Season 2 (2017)

Notes
  Episode 16 was hosted by Peter van Onselen while Speers was on parental leave.
  Episode 25 was hosted by Kristina Keneally while Speers was on holidays. Additionally, neither Hartcher or Kelly appeared.
  Episode 36 was hosted by Kieran Gilbert while Speers was on holidays. Additionally, neither Hartcher or Kelly appeared.
  Episode 41 aired on a Wednesday as a special episode following coverage of the 2016 United States presidential election.
  Episode 19 was hosted by Kieran Gilbert while Speers was on assignment, filming segments for the following episode of Speers Tonight. Additionally, neither Hartcher or Kelly appeared.
  Episode 25 was hosted by Peter van Onselen while Speers was on leave.
  Episode 27 was hosted by Samantha Maiden while Speers was on leave.
  Episode 28 was hosted by Kieran Gilbert while Speers was on leave.

References

External links
Sky News Official site

Australian non-fiction television series
English-language television shows
Sky News Australia
2016 Australian television series debuts
2017 Australian television series endings